The Bruneian ambassador in Beijing is the official representative of the Government in Bandar Seri Begawan to the Government of the People's Republic of China.

List of representatives

See also 
 Brunei–China relations

References 

 
China
Brunei